Thomas Brewster may refer to:

Thomas Brewster (Doctor Who), a fictional character that appears in Doctor Who audio plays
Thomas Brewster (translator) (1705–?), English doctor and translator
Tom Brewster (born 1974), Scottish curler